Plus-X or Plus X may refer to

 Venus Plus X, a 1960 science fiction novel written by Theodore Sturgeon
 "Plus X", a 1956 science fiction novella by Eric Frank Russell, later expanded into Next of Kin
 +×, a logo for EDM artist Martin Garrix
 +x, adding execute permission with the system call chmod as used in Unix-like operating systems.

See also
Plus-size clothing